Michael Chase Thomas (born  June 10, 1989) is an American football linebacker who is currently a free agent. He was originally signed by the New Orleans Saints as an undrafted free agent.

Early years
Thomas attended Walton High School in Marietta, Georgia. Thomas was ranked as the 26th prospect from the state of Georgia and was the 27th prospect at the outside linebacker position by Rivals.com. Thomas was also named to the  All-Southeast Region for the Class of 2008 by PrepStar. He played in the Under Armour All-America Game after his senior season in high school. Thomas earned first-team all-state honors and was named the Cobb County Defensive Player of the Year following his outstanding Junior season with 82 tackles, 10 sacks and a fumble recovery.

College career
Thomas was named an All-American by Sporting News in 2011 after recording 51 tackles and 8.5 sacks.

Professional career

2013 NFL Combine

New Orleans Saints
On April 27, 2013, Thomas was signed as an undrafted free agent by the New Orleans Saints. On August 19, 2013, he was waived by the Saints.

Oakland Raiders
On August 20, 2013, the Oakland Raiders claimed Chase Thomas off waivers from the Saints. On August, 31st he was waived by the Raiders.

Atlanta Falcons
He was signed to the Atlanta Falcons practice squad on September 17, 2013.

San Francisco 49ers
He signed with the San Francisco 49ers on May 27, 2014. Thomas was on the 53-member roster for weeks 10, 11, 12 and 16.

References

External links
Stanford Cardinal bio

1989 births
Living people
Players of American football from Marietta, Georgia
American football defensive ends
American football linebackers
Stanford Cardinal football players
New Orleans Saints players
Oakland Raiders players
Atlanta Falcons players
San Francisco 49ers players
Green Bay Packers players